The Kilgore Mill Covered Bridge and Mill Site, near Bethlehem, Georgia, was listed on the National Register of Historic Places in 1975.  The bridge, built in 1894, has also been known as the Bethlehem Bridge, the Apalachee River Bridge, and the Briscoe Mill Bridge

References

Covered bridges in Georgia (U.S. state)
National Register of Historic Places in Barrow County, Georgia
Infrastructure completed in 1894